The Roman Theatre at Apamea is a Roman theatre in ancient Apamea in northwestern Syria. Originally a Hellenistic theatre, the monumental structure was one of the largest theatres in the Roman world.

Overview

However, much of the theatre structure is in ruins due to architectural collapses and extensive quarrying in later epochs, and only one-eighth of the site has been exposed so far. Situated along the western end of the decumanus, the monumental theatre was built into a steep hill overlooking the Orontes River valley.

One of the main features at the theatre is its water basin and the elaborate Roman piping system used in it. The recently excavated terracotta system is located along the eastern ground entrance and is well preserved.

History
The theatre was originally a Hellenistic theatre dating to the early Seleucid era. The Hellenistic theatre probably lies under the Roman structures of the ima cavea, media cavea, and the orchestra. The theatre was expanded and remodeled in the early Roman period, during the reign of either Julius Caesar, Augustus, or Tiberius. The theatre's main stage was remodeled and its entrances were reorganized in a more typical Roman fashion. The 115 Antioch earthquake caused severe damage to the structure. It was rebuilt soon-after under patronage from both Trajan and Hadrian. The theatre was further expanded in the first half of the third century CE.

Under the Byzantine Empire the theatre's drainage basin was restructured and a qanat was built through the middle of the lower stage. By the late Byzantine period the theatre had stopped serving as a center for theatrical performances. However, the theatre and its qanat continued to play an important role as a water resource during the Byzantine and Islamic periods.

Excavation
The site has been heavily damaged through quarrying during the Ayyubid, Mamluk and Ottoman eras. The first archaeological exploration of the site happened around the early 1930s by an American mission. Between 1931 and 1939 the site was excavated by a Belgian archaeological team from the University of Brussels. The team attempted to clear several parts of the site from architectural falls. However, all unpublished field notes and artefacts from the expedition were lost when the university was bombed during World War II. Exploration of the site was only resumed in the late 1960s. It was abandoned in 1971 by the Belgian mission due to the expensive and difficult nature of the work needed to clear the large theatre.

In 2007 a joint Syro-American team, from the Syrian Directorate-General of Antiquities and Museums and Brigham Young University, restarted the archaeological exploration of the site with a view to restoring and reconstructing the ancient theatre. The team's preliminary results were first published in 2010.

References

Bibliography

Ancient Roman theatres in Syria
Ancient Greek theatres
Apamea, Syria
Buildings and structures in Hama Governorate